The 2019–20 Eredivisie was the 64th season of the Dutch football league Eredivisie since its establishment in 1955. The season began on 2 August 2019 and was suspended on 12 March 2020 due to the COVID-19 pandemic in the Netherlands. The season was abandoned on 24 April.

Ajax were the defending champion. Twente, RKC Waalwijk, and Sparta Rotterdam joined as the promoted clubs from the 2018–19 Eerste Divisie. They replaced NAC Breda, Excelsior, and De Graafschap who were relegated to the 2019–20 Eerste Divisie.

Effects of the COVID-19 pandemic 
On 12 March 2020, all football leagues were suspended until 31 March as the Dutch government prohibited events due to the COVID-19 pandemic in the Netherlands. On 15 March this period was extended until 6 April. Following the decision of the Dutch government to prohibit all gatherings and events until 1 June 2020, this period was further extended.

On 2 April, several clubs including Ajax, AZ and PSV indicated they were not willing to play the remainder of the season.

The Dutch government announced on 21 April that all events subject to authorization would remain prohibited until at least 1 September 2020. As a result, the KNVB announced on the same day that it did not intend to resume the 2019–20 season. A final decision would be taken after consultation with the UEFA and debating the consequences with the clubs involved.

On 24 April 2020 the KNVB announced their final decision:
 The ranking on 8 March 2020 is the final ranking, but Ajax will not be champions.
 There will be no promotion nor relegation between the Eredivisie and Eerste Divisie.
 European places will be assigned based on the ranking on 8 March: Champions League for Ajax and AZ, and Europa League for Feyenoord, PSV, and Willem II.

The KNVB had intended to resume the season on 19 June behind closed doors, but announced in a statement that the government's decision to ban all public events until September made it impossible to finish the season on time.

Teams 
A total of 18 teams took part in the league.

Stadiums and locations 

AZ only played their first home game at AFAS Stadion due to the stadium's roof collapse on 10 August 2019. From then on they've played their home matches at the 17,000-capacity Cars Jeans Stadion in The Hague, home of ADO Den Haag. AZ returned to their 'roofless' AFAS Stadion for the match against Ajax on 15 December 2019.

Personnel and kits

Managerial changes

Standings

Fixtures/results

Results by round

Season statistics

Top scorers

Hat-tricks

Assists

Attendance

Awards

Monthly awards

References 

2019-20
Netherlands
Eredivisie
Eredivisie